Kit Pongetti (born June 15, 1970) is an American actress, musician, writer and director, known for several acting roles, including playing Lady, the wife of the Janitor, in the show Scrubs and also for her role as Marta Trundel in iCarly.

Early life
Pongetti was born in Kingsville, Texas and soon thereafter moved to Clear Lake, a suburb of Houston, Texas. Her father was a chemical engineer and her mother taught mathematics at Arizona State University.  Pongetti graduated from the University of Texas at Austin in 1993 and moved to Los Angeles in 1994.

Career
Pongetti performed in the band Those Who Dig. She began work in Los Angeles as an assistant to writers on the TV Series Roseanne in 1995.  Thereafter, she began doing improvisational comedy at The Groundlings Theater, IO West and UCB.  She has also performed music that was used in the TV series Gilmore Girls ("My Little Corner of the World", episode "Pilot") and My Boys (episode "Dinner Party"), as well as helping to write and perform a song used in the movie Van Wilder ("Do-Si-Do").

Pongetti devoted herself full-time to acting starting in late 2002. Since that time, she has performed in a variety of commercial and theatrical television and film roles.

In 2011, she was accepted in the AFI's Directing Workshop for Women and her short film STAKEOUT received AFI's prestigious Nancy Malone Living Trust Award and the Jean Picker Firstenberg Award. 

Pongetti co-wrote and directed DON'T STOP: THE MUSICAL which performed at Largo at the Coronet Theater from April 2018 to February 2020.

Filmography

Film

Television

References

External links

Video Clips

1970 births
Living people
American film actresses
American television actresses
Actresses from Texas
People from Kingsville, Texas
21st-century American women